Rogelio Sánchez González (23 April 1921 – 22 December 2011) was a Mexican prelate of the Roman Catholic Church.

Sánchez González was born in San José de Gracia, Michoacán, Mexico. Sánchez González ordained a priest on March 25, 1944. Sánchez González was appointed bishop of the Diocese of Colima on July 23, 1972, and ordained bishop on October 4, 1972. Sánchez González would resign as bishop of Colima on February 8, 1980. Bishop Rogelio Sanchez Gonzalez died December 22, 2011, at San Jose de Gracia, Michoacan.

External links
Catholic-Hierarchy

1921 births
2011 deaths
20th-century Roman Catholic bishops in Mexico
People from Michoacán